Porobashinee is a 2017 Bangladeshi science fiction film. It is the first science fiction film in Bangladesh. The film is directed by Swapan Ahmed and produced by Reggae Entertainment. Film shooting took place in France, Italy and Mumbai and was overseen by an international crew. The post-production involved 3D conversion and the application of visual effects.

Plot
A Group of Bangladeshi Scientists discovers a planet "Aris-32" but a highly advanced & evolved human-like native alien species of Aris-32 gets the information of their planet being discovered and comes to Earth to stop the satellite technology of Earth, in order to blind the astronomers and space scientists. But the story gets more interesting when the lead alien of their mission, who's a female falls in love with a Bangladeshi human named Niloy. The aliens are exposed, and Niloy fights with all to save her.

Cast
 Emon
 Reeth Mazumder
 Sabyasachi Chakrabarty
 June Malia
 Opshora Ali
 Chashi Alam
 Urvashi Rautela as Special appearance in the song "Chalo Bhai"
 Shataf Figar as voice over artist "CIA OFFICER"
 Rajesh kr Chattopadhyay as voice over artist

Soundtrack
The Music Was Composed By Ibrar Tipu, Binit, DJ AKS and Released by Reggae Entertainment.

References

Further reading

External links
 

2017 films
2017 science fiction action films
Bengali-language Bangladeshi films
Bangladeshi action films
Bangladeshi science fiction films
Films shot in Africa
Films shot in Australia
Films shot in Belgium
Films shot in Denmark
Films shot in France
Films shot in Germany
Films shot in Italy
Films shot in the Netherlands
Films shot in Switzerland
Films shot in the United States
Films scored by Ibrar Tipu
2010s Bengali-language films
Post-apocalyptic films